Christopher John Weitz (born November 30, 1969) is an American film director, screenwriter, and producer. He is best known for his work with his brother Paul on the comedy films American Pie and About a Boy; the latter earned the Weitz brothers a nomination for the Academy Award for Best Adapted Screenplay. Among his other main works, Weitz directed the film adaptation of the novel The Golden Compass and the film adaptation of New Moon from the series of Twilight books, wrote the screenplay for Disney's 2015 live-action adaptation of Cinderella, and co-wrote Rogue One: A Star Wars Story with Tony Gilroy.

Early life 
Weitz was born in New York City, the son of actress Susan Kohner and Berlin-born novelist/menswear designer John Weitz. His brother is filmmaker Paul Weitz. Weitz is the grandson of Czech-born agent and producer Paul Kohner and actress Lupita Tovar on his maternal side. Tovar, who was from Oaxaca, Mexico, starred in Santa, Mexico's first talkie, in 1932, as well as a Spanish language version of Drácula.  Weitz' paternal grandparents escaped Nazi Germany, before which his grandfather was a successful textile manufacturer, with the family being intimates of writer Christopher Isherwood and actress Marlene Dietrich.

Weitz's father and maternal grandfather were Jewish, whereas his maternal grandmother was Catholic; he was raised in a nonreligious household. He has also described himself as a "lapsed Catholic crypto-Buddhist."

As a young boy, Weitz attended Allen-Stevenson School with his brother and was a member of the Knickerbocker Greys, a long-standing New York City youth marching corps that has been in existence since 1881.

When he was 14 years old, Weitz went to the boarding school St Paul's School in London, which his father had attended. He graduated with a degree in English from Trinity College, Cambridge.

Career

Early career (1998–2006) 
Weitz' early career involved many collaborations with his brother. Some of the work they have done as screenwriters has been both credited and uncredited.

Weitz began his film career as a co-writer on the animated film Antz (1998). He followed this with work on various sitcoms such as Off Centre and the 1998 revival of the 1977 TV series Fantasy Island. In 1999, he and Paul directed and produced American Pie, which was written by Adam Herz, and became a major box office success. Weitz returned as executive producer on the film's two theatrical sequels. In 2001, along with his brother, he co-directed his second film, the Chris Rock comedy Down to Earth.

In 2002, the Weitz brothers co-wrote and co-directed About a Boy, the Hugh Grant film based on the book by Nick Hornby. The film was originally set up at New Line Cinema with Robert De Niro producing, and the main character as an American. The brothers felt that it was important that the character is British. Inspiration came from the 1960 film The Apartment. They were nominated for an Academy Award for Best Adapted Screenplay.

Weitz has produced a number of films including In Good Company and American Dreamz, both of which were directed by his brother, Paul.

The Golden Compass (2007)
In 2003, Weitz was hired to direct New Line Cinema's adaptation of the first book in Philip Pullman's His Dark Materials series, The Golden Compass, after approaching the studio with an unsolicited 40-page treatment. He was subsequently invited by director Peter Jackson to visit the set of King Kong, in order to gain insight into directing a big-budget film and advice on how to deal with New Line. In 2005, Weitz announced his departure from the film, citing the enormous technical challenges involved, and the fear of being denounced by both the book's fans and detractors; he was subsequently replaced by British director Anand Tucker. Tucker left the project in 2006 over creative differences with New Line, and Weitz returned to the director's chair after receiving a letter from Pullman asking him to reconsider.

During post-production, New Line had Weitz's editor replaced, and the studio made the final cut with severe differences from Weitz's vision, trimming the originally unhappy ending and watering down the religious theme. Weitz declared that
It was a terrible experience because I was able to shoot what I wanted to — and then the cut of the movie was taken away from me and any reference to religion or religious ideas was removed. And the darkness and threat at the end of the story — anything that made it not a happy, popcorn-type movie — was removed. The voice of the key character was redone, all of this against my will. And the fact of the matter is the people that the studio was afraid were going to raise up arms against the movie did it anyway.

The film was released in 2007 and was met with mixed reviews. Its U.S. grosses have been described as disappointing in relation to film's US$180 million budget, although it was a "stellar performer" outside the U.S. with a "stunning" box office likely to hit $250 million. When questioned about a possible sequel, New Line studio co-head Michael Lynne said that "The jury is still very much out on the movie..." The second and third screenplays have been written but because of the economic recession and the protest by the Catholic Church, the two sequels never got made and was later rebooted into a television series that was released in 2019. Its worldwide box office gross stands at $372,234,864.

The Twilight Saga: New Moon (2009) 
In December 2008, Weitz was announced as the director of the sequel to Twilight, the film adaptation of the novel New Moon by Stephenie Meyer. Weitz said he felt a tremendous sense of responsibility to live up to the expectations of the passionate fan base.

The Twilight Saga: New Moon opened in November 2009, one year after the first movie was released. New Moon set records as the biggest midnight opening in domestic box office history, grossing an estimated $26.3 million in 3,514 theatres, previously held by Harry Potter and the Half-Blood Prince. The film grossed $72.7 million on its opening day domestically, becoming the biggest single-day opening in domestic history, beating the $67.2 million tally of The Dark Knight.. This opening strongly contributed to another record: the first time that the top ten films at the domestic box office had a combined gross of over $100 million in a single day.

The opening weekend of New Moon was the third-highest opening weekend in US domestic history with $142,839,137, and the sixth-highest worldwide opening weekend with $274.9 million total. With an estimated budget of just under $50 million, New Moon is the least expensive movie to ever open to more than $200 million worldwide. Over Thanksgiving weekend, the film grossed $42.5 million, and including Wednesday and Thursday ticket sales it grossed $66 million. It earned $230.7 million in its first ten days, $38 million more than the previous installment grossed in its entire theatrical run. Internationally, the film grossed roughly $85 million over Thanksgiving weekend, adding up to a total worldwide gross of $473.7 million in ten days. Weitz decided not to continue to direct the next film in the franchise.

Other projects 
In June 2011, Summit Entertainment released his film A Better Life, written by Eric Eason about a Hispanic gardener and his son in Los Angeles searching for their stolen truck. This film is unusual among Hollywood productions in that it is set in a Hispanic community and features an almost entirely Hispanic cast. Weitz said that working on the film allowed him to explore his Hispanic heritage—his grandmother is from Mexico—and learn Spanish. The film was nominated for an Oscar.

In 2012, he worked with journalist Jose Antonio Vargas on a series of four documentary shorts directed by Weitz called Is This Alabama?, about the effects of the state of Alabama's anti-immigration legislation, 2011's Alabama HB 56. The project was a collaboration between Weitz, Vargas, the Center for American Progress think-tank, America's Voice Education Fund, and Vargas' Define American campaign, with Vargas doing the interviews.

Weitz wrote the screenplay for Disney's 2015 live-action adaptation of Cinderella, which was released in theaters on March 13, 2015. Weitz said he went back to the many different versions of the story (Brothers Grimm, Charles Perrault, as well as the 1950 animated Disney original) as well as his own vision.

Weitz scripted the first Star Wars stand-alone film, director Gareth Edwards' Rogue One (2016). Replacing Gary Whitta, Weitz shares writing duties with acclaimed filmmaker Tony Gilroy. In 2017, Weitz and J. Mills Goodloe co-wrote the script for Fox 2000's The Mountain Between Us, a film adaptation of the novel of the same name, by Charles Martin.

Weitz will be writing the screen adaptation of 21 Years to Midnight, a movie about same-sex marriage documented in the legal case Obergefell v. Hodges.

Weitz directed Operation Finale, a 2018 MGM historical drama thriller film, written by Matthew Orton, about the Mossad and Shin Bet teams that captured Adolf Eichmann. The film starred Oscar Isaac, Ben Kingsley, Lior Raz, Mélanie Laurent, Nick Kroll, and Joe Alwyn.

Acting 
Weitz has also occasionally worked as an actor, playing the lead role in the 2000 comedy film Chuck & Buck and a bland suburbanite in Mr. & Mrs. Smith.

In development 
Weitz has a production company with his brother Paul Weitz and producer Andrew Miano called Depth of Field. In March 2016, Weitz and his brother signed a two-year first look deal with Amazon Studios.
 A live-action adaptation Michael Moorcock's Elric saga, which Weitz said he enjoyed as a child. Weitz's Depth of Field production company was meant to create the films as a potential trilogy for Universal Pictures. In a May 2007 interview with Empire magazine he announced that he had met with Moorcock, who trusted him with the films, and described his wish for Paul to direct the film.
 Shield of Straw – producing an English remake of the 2013 Japanese action thriller, Shield of Straw
 Ghost Train – producing a remake of the 2006 Japanese horror film, Soul Reviver
 Birthright – producing a remake of the 2010 Japanese thriller
 Like Father, Like Son – writing an adaptation of a remake of the 2013 Japanese drama for Steven Spielberg
 Sinatoro – producing TV series with Grant Morrison for Universal Television

Author 
Weitz wrote a young adult novel trilogy series that began with The Young World, in 2014, and was followed by The New Order, in 2015 and The Revival in 2016. The series follows a group of teenagers struggling to survive in a post-apocalyptic world where a disease killed off all adults over the age of 18.

Weitz said that he used the concept of natural intelligence theories called Society of Mind created by Marvin Minsky to create the stories that were loosely autobiographical about growing up in New York City.

Personal life 
Weitz is married to Mercedes Martinez, who is Cuban Mexican, and with whom he has one son, Sebastian Weitz and a daughter, Athena Weitz. Weitz said he met Martinez at the Burning Man festival.

In 2004, Weitz was a co-investor with Paul Devitt in the Japanese restaurant and club called Tokio on N. Cahuenga in Los Angeles.

On November 11, 2016, after Donald Trump won the presidential election, Weitz tweeted, "Please note that the Empire is a white supremacist (human) organization." Although he had apologized and deleted the tweet, several Trump supporters have used the hashtag #DumpStarWars and claimed that Rogue One contained an anti-Trump scene.

Filmography

Films 

Acting roles

Documentaries

Television 

Other credits

Works and publications

See also 
 Paul Weitz
 Susan Kohner
 John Weitz
 Lupita Tovar
 Paul Kohner

References

External links 

 
 

1969 births
Alumni of Trinity College, Cambridge
21st-century American businesspeople
American film directors
Comedy film directors
Living people
American people of Czech-Jewish descent
American people of German-Jewish descent
American male actors of Mexican descent
Male actors from New York City
Kohner family